Elizabeth Wood is an American film director and screenwriter, best known for her feature film debut White Girl.

Film career
In 2007, Wood made her feature film debut with the documentary film Wade in the Water Children, revolving around a violent neighborhood in New Orleans, Louisiana.

Wood made her narrative feature film debut with White Girl which premiere at the 2016 Sundance Film Festival on January 23, 2016. FilmRise and Netflix later acquired distribution rights to the film. It was released on September 2, 2016. The film is loosely based on Wood's life.

Personal life
Wood has been married to producer and director Gabriel Nussbaum since 2009. The two operate the production company Bank Street Films.

Filmography

Film

References

External links

Living people
American screenwriters
American women film directors
American women screenwriters
English-language film directors
Year of birth missing (living people)
21st-century American women